SS City of Johannesburg was a British cargo steamship that was sunk in 1942. She was built by Barclay, Curle & Co, of Whiteinch, Glasgow in 1920, for Hall Lines of Liverpool, a subsidiary of Ellerman Lines, being launched as SS Melford Hall. She was renamed SS City of Johannesburg in 1926.

Sinking
Her final voyage was to take her from Calcutta to the United Kingdom, calling at Colombo on 6 October 1942 and later at Cape Town on the way. She carried 7,750 tons of general cargo, including pig iron, cotton, jute and tea, under the command of her master, Walter Armour Owen.

At 2312 hours on 23 October she was travelling unescorted off East London South Africa, when she was sighted by  commanded by Fritz Poske. The U-boat torpedoed the City of Johannesburg, and succeeded in sinking her. Two of the 89 crew were lost, but the master and 12 crew members were rescued by the Dutch cargo ship Zypenberg, which took them to Durban.

References

Melford Hall at clydeships

1920 ships
Ships built on the River Clyde
Maritime incidents in October 1942
Ships of the Ellerman Lines
Ships sunk by German submarines in World War II
Steamships of the United Kingdom
World War II merchant ships of the United Kingdom
World War II shipwrecks in the Indian Ocean